The Evens  (pl. They live in regions of the Magadan Oblast and Kamchatka Krai and northern parts of Sakha east of the Lena River. According to the 2002 census, there were 19,071 Evens in Russia. According to the 2010 census, there were 22,383 Evens in Russia. They speak their own language called Even, one of the Tungusic languages. The Evens are close to the Evenks by their origins and culture. Officially, they have been considered to be of Orthodox faith since the 19th century, though the Evens have retained some pre-Christian practices, such as shamanism. Traditional Even life is centred upon nomadic pastoralism of domesticated reindeer, supplemented with hunting, fishing and animal-trapping. There were 104 Evens in Ukraine, 19 of whom spoke Even. (Ukr. Cen. 2001)

History

The ancestors of the Evens were believed to have migrated from the Transbaikal area to the coastal areas of eastern Siberia. The economy was supplemented by winter hunts to obtain wild game. Hunters sometimes rode reindeer, sometimes moved along on wooden skis. 

In the 17th century, the people today known as the Eveni were divided into three main tribes: the Okhotsk reindeer Tungus (Lamut), the Tiugesir, Memel’ and Buiaksir clans as well as a sedentary group of Arman’ speakers. Today, they are all known as Eveni. 

The traditional lodgings of the Evens were conical tents which were covered with animal skins. In the southern coastal areas, fish skins were used. Settled Evens used a type of earth and log dugout. Sheds were erected near the dwellings in order to house stocks of frozen fish and meat.

The Soviet years marked significant changes for the Evens. The Soviets created a written language for them and got rid of illiteracy among the Evens in the 1930s. Many nomadic Evens chose to settle down, joined the kolkhozes and engaged themselves in cattle-breeding and agriculture.

Notable Evens
Varvara Belolyubskaya, linguist and poet
Viktor Lebedev, freestyle wrestler

References

Further reading
James Forsyth, "A History of the Peoples of Siberia",1992

External links
 The Red Book of the Peoples of the Russian Empire: The Evens
 Aboriginal Peoples of the Russian North: Links to On-Line Resources
 Notes on the Evens and Evenks

Ethnic groups in Russia
Tungusic peoples
Indigenous peoples of North Asia
Indigenous small-numbered peoples of the North, Siberia and the Far East
Indigenous peoples in the Arctic
Modern nomads